Albert Edward Legge (8 February 1903–1998) was an English footballer who played in the Football League for Charlton Athletic, Gillingham, Queens Park Rangers and Wolverhampton Wanderers.

References

1903 births
1998 deaths
English footballers
Association football forwards
English Football League players
Wolverhampton Wanderers F.C. players
Gillingham F.C. players
Queens Park Rangers F.C. players
Telford United F.C. players
Cradley Heath F.C. players
Hednesford Town F.C. players